Giovanni Zeno Giambelli (June 29, 1879 – December 31, 1953) was an Italian mathematician who is best known for Giambelli's formula.

References

External links 
 Giovanni Zeno Giambelli bio

1879 births
1935 deaths
20th-century Italian mathematicians